Tapestry is the debut studio album by American folk singer Don McLean. The album was originally released by Mediarts Records but was re-launched in 1971 by United Artists after United Artists' purchase of Mediarts. The album was also reissued in 1981 on Liberty Records, but without including the song "Three Flights Up".

The title track "Tapestry" was an inspiration for the formation of the Greenpeace environmental movement. "And I Love You So" is one of McLean's most recorded songs, with versions by artists ranging from Elvis Presley in the 1970s and to Glen Campbell nearly 30 years later. Perry Como had a huge international hit with the song in 1973.

The album was produced by Jerry Corbitt of the Youngbloods. The album was recorded at the Sierra Sound Laboratories, 1741 Alcatraz Ave, Berkeley, CA in 1969-70.

Track listing

Chart positions

Personnel
 Don McLean – vocals, lead guitar, banjo
 Richard Turner – guitar, bass guitar
 Peter Childs – dobro, bass guitar
 Jerry Corbitt – bass guitar
 Gregory Dewey, Jeff Meyer – drums
 Scott Lawrence - piano 
Edward Bogas – piano, string arrangements
Technical
Bob DeSousa, Roy Ward - engineer
Ed Freeman, Tom Flye - mixing
Norber Jobst – cover design
Julie Snow - photography

Release history

References

Don McLean albums
1970 debut albums
United Artists Records albums
Mediarts Records albums